South City is a micro-township in Kolkata, India.

South City may also refer to:
 South City Mall, ; the largest shopping mall in East India, located in Kolkata.
 South San Francisco; South San Francisco, CA.